Jaco Nepgen (born 3 January 1986) is a former South African rugby union footballer that played as either lock or flank. He also represented South Africa Universities in 2008 and 2009. In 2009 Nepgen was named Rugby Player  of the year for Maties

He retired in July 2016 following doctor's advice, having made 90 first class appearances.

Youth rugby

He started his playing career at Hoërskool Hangklip where he was chosen for the school's first XV at the age of 16 and later captained the team in his final year. Schoolboy honours include Border under-16 (2002) and two years (2003 and 2004) representing the Border Under-18 Craven Week squad.

He also represented his school's first XI cricket team from the age of 15 and received Border Country District provincial honours in cricket at under-15 and under-19 levels in 2001, 2002 and 2003.

Coaching
In 2020 Nepgen was appointed as Deputy Principal - Sports Development at Nico Malan Highschool in Humansdorp, South Africa

References

External links
 
 itsrugby.co.uk profile
 http://www.matiesrugby.co.za/Uploads/2013%20Jaarverslag%20Publiseer.pdf
 

Living people
1986 births
South African rugby union players
Rugby union flankers
People from Queenstown, South Africa
Griquas (rugby union) players
SWD Eagles players
Stellenbosch University alumni
Rugby union players from the Eastern Cape